Fatima Surayya Bajia  (1 September 1930 – 10 February 2016) was an Urdu novelist, playwright and drama writer from Pakistan. She was awarded various awards at home and abroad including Japan's highest civil award in recognition of her works. Bajia remained Advisor to the Chief Minister of Sindh province in Pakistan, and was a member of the managing committee of the Arts Council of Pakistan. She died on 10 February 2016 in Karachi, aged 85.

A well-known personality in social welfare, literary Radio, TV and Stage, Bajia wrote for PTV Centres Islamabad and Lahore since the launch of those television channels. She wrote her first long play Mehman. She contributed to literary programmes such as Auraaq and beauty care programmes under the title Aaraish-e-Khaam-e-Kakal. Bajia also produced various children programmes. Bajia was also an ardent feminist.

Early life
A native of Hyderabad, India, she was born near "Panj Bibi Mountain", in the town of Raichur in the present state of Karnataka. She migrated to Pakistan soon after independence, along with her family. She never received any formal education, and was instead homeschooled.  Despite this she is ranked an eminent intellectual, reader and writer.

Talking about her childhood, she said, "I never attended a formal school. The elders of the family decided that all my education should take place at home. The teacher lived in our home where we were taught discipline along with our education. My family was settled in Hyderabad Deccan, which was then a paramount cultural center in undivided India. Although there were a few prominent schools e.g. Saint Josephs School, although my grandfather could afford the fee (which was Rs. 20), he still preferred to educate us at home. These schools were primarily attended by pampered girls from the elite families of nawabs and jagirdars. From the beginning we were taught self-sufficiency, although we employed 60 to 70 servants, we were not allowed to ask anyone of them for water. There was a huge difference between girls of the elite families and us. My grandfather felt that if we attended such schools, we would suffer from an inferiority complex, but since proper upbringing is not possible without coaching, he decided to carry out our education at home. Nevertheless, we were taught all the subjects that were taught in the formal Hyderabad schools with separate teachers for every subject e.g. calligraphy and math."

Career
Bajia first became involved with PTV in the 1960s when her flight to Karachi was delayed and she came to PTV Islamabad station for a visit. Director Agha Nasir hired her and Bajia made her debut as an actress in 1966 in one of his plays. She began writing afterwards. Nasir  is quoted to have said, “During Zia ul Haq's time when the 'dupatta policy' was implemented and women were forced to behave a certain way, Bajia wrote about characters from Baghdad and Granada. This was brilliant because these places were supposedly Islamic societies and no one could say anything about them." 
He further added that when writing a play, Bajia would literally move with her belongings to the TV station and then become an authority by default.“Anyone who had a problem would go to Bajia, not to the chief of the organisation."

Awards, honours and recognition
Bajia won numerous awards, including the Pride of Performance Award in 1996 for her services to the performing arts in Pakistan. It is one of the highest civil awards conferred by the Pakistan Government. She was also awarded Japan's highest civil award in recognition of her works. She remained Advisor to the Chief Minister of Sindh province in Pakistan. In 1979 she was awarded Special Nigar Award for her contribution towards television and in 1985 she got another Nigar Award for best writer. Most recently she appeared in The Big Show on CNBC alongside another legendary writer Haseena Moin. In 2013, she was awarded Hilal-i-Imtiaz by President of Pakistan.

On 22 May 2012 Bajia's biography, titled Apki Bajia (Your Bajia) was released. The book had been written by Syeda Iffat Hasan Rizvi after six years of research.

Illness and death
Bajia died on 10 February 2016 in Karachi, at the age of 85 from throat cancer.

Tribute
On 1 September 2018, to commemorate what would have been her 88th birthday, Google released a Google Doodle celebrating her.

Plays
Some of her popular drama serials:

 Shama 1974 (adapted from a novel by A.R. Khatoon)
 Afshan (adapted from a novel by A.R. Khatoon)
 Aroosa (adapted from a novel by Zubaida Khatoon)
 Tasweer (adapted from a novel by A.R. Khatoon)
 Zeenat (adapted from a Sindhi novel by Mirza Quleech Baig)
 Ana
 Aagahi
 Aabgeenay
 Babar
 Tareekh-o-Tamseel
 Ghar aik Nagar
 Faraz Aik Karz
 Phool Rahi Sarsoon
 Tasveer-e-Kainaat
 Asaavari
 Arzoo
 Sassi Punno
 Anarkali
 Auraq
 Jisse Piya Chahe

See also
 Anwar Maqsood
 Zubaida Tariq
 Zehra Nigah

References

External links
 

Recipients of the Pride of Performance
Pakistani dramatists and playwrights
Urdu-language novelists
Pakistani television writers
20th-century women writers
Recipients of Hilal-i-Imtiaz
Writers from Karachi
Muhajir people
Pakistani people of Hyderabadi descent
Deaths from throat cancer
Deaths from cancer in Pakistan
1930 births
PTV Award winners
2016 deaths
Pakistani women novelists
Pakistani novelists
Maqsood family
20th-century Pakistani women writers
20th-century Pakistani writers
Women television writers
20th-century Pakistani actresses
Pakistani television actresses
21st-century Pakistani actresses
Nigar Award winners